Henry Cyril Paget, 5th Marquess of Anglesey (16 June 1875 – 14 March 1905), styled Lord Paget until 1880 and Earl of Uxbridge between 1880 and 1898, and nicknamed "Toppy", was a British peer who was notable during his short life for squandering his inheritance on a lavish social life and accumulating massive debts. Regarded as the "black sheep" of the family, he was dubbed "the dancing marquess" and for his Butterfly Dancing, taken from Loie Fuller, where a voluminous robe of transparent white silk would be waved like wings.

Vicary Gibbs, writing in The Complete Peerage in 1910, commented that he "seems only to have existed for the purpose of giving a melancholy and unneeded illustration of the truth that a man with the finest prospects, may, by the wildest folly and extravagance, as Sir Thomas Browne says, 'foully miscarry in the advantage of humanity, play away an uniterable life, and have lived in vain.'"

Family background
Paget was the eldest son of the 4th Marquess by his father's second wife, Blanche Mary Boyd. However, rumours persisted that his biological father was the French actor Benoît-Constant Coquelin, a rumour that gained some currency when, according to some sources, after the death of his mother in 1877, when he was two years old, Paget reportedly was raised by Coquelin's sister-in-law in Paris until he was eight. That story seems to have been a confusion of facts. The sister-in-law, née Edith Marion Boyd, was the fourth marquess's aunt, one of his mother's sisters, and she did not wed Coquelin's brother Gustave until 1891. His stepmother from 1880 was an American, Mary "Minna" Livingston King, the widow of the Hon. Henry Wodehouse.

He attended Eton College, later receiving private tuition, and was commissioned as a Lieutenant in the 2nd Volunteer Battalion of the Royal Welsh Fusiliers. On 20 January 1898 he married his cousin Lilian Florence Maud Chetwynd (1876–1962).

Lifestyle

Paget swiftly acquired a reputation for a lavish and spendthrift manner of living. He used his money to buy jewellery and furs, and to throw extravagant parties and flamboyant theatrical performances. He renamed the family's country seat Plas Newydd as "Anglesey Castle" and converted the chapel there into a 150-seat theatre, named the Gaiety Theatre. Here he took the lead role, opulently costumed, in productions ranging from pantomime and comedy to performances of Oscar Wilde's An Ideal Husband and Shakespeare's Henry V. Early performances from around 1899 were mostly variety performances of song and dance numbers, sketches and tableaux vivants in front of an invited audience of notable local people. In 1901, the Gaiety Theatre was refurbished and fitted out with electric stage lighting and re-opened as a public entertainment venue.

For three years Paget took his theatre company on tour around Britain and Europe. His wife disapproved of his lifestyle and obtained a decree nisi of divorce on 7 November 1900; the marriage was later annulled due to nonconsummation, according to Lady Anglesey's grandson by her second marriage, the historian Christopher Simon Sykes. The breakdown of his marriage effectively gave Paget more freedom to enjoy his self-indulgent lifestyle. By this stage, he had already begun to mortgage his estates to raise money.

Theft
On 10 September 1901, Paget attended the London premiere of Arthur Conan Doyle's stage adaptation of Sherlock Holmes at the Lyceum Theatre, London. At the time, Paget was living in the Walsingham House Hotel in London. Paget's French valet Julian Gault took the opportunity of his employer's absence at the theatre to steal jewellery to the value of £50,000. Distraught at the theft, Paget enlisted the help of Conan Doyle to find the stolen jewels. Gault, who was later arrested at Dover, testified in court that he had been instructed to steal the jewels by a French woman of his acquaintance called Mathilde (who had taken the jewels to France and was never found). Although Gault's testimony was believed to be true, he pleaded guilty at the Old Bailey on 22 October and was sentenced to five years' imprisonment.

Sexuality
Paget's outrageous and flamboyant lifestyle, his taste for cross-dressing, and the breakdown of his marriage, have led many to assume that he was homosexual. Writing in 1970, the homosexual reformer H. Montgomery Hyde characterised him as "[t]he most notorious aristocratic homosexual at this period". One journalist wrote, "I am driven to the conclusion from much that I have seen that there are men who ought to have been born women, and women who ought to have been born men … Bearing the form of a man, he yet had all the tastes, something even of the appearance, of not only a woman, but, if the phrase be permissible, a very effeminate woman". Norena Shopland wrote that "there is little doubt that Henry must be included in the history of gender identity."

There is no evidence for or against his having had any lovers of either sex: performance historian Viv Gardner believes rather that he was "a classic narcissist: the only person he could love and make love to was himself, because, for whatever reason, he was 'unlovable'". The deliberate destruction by his family of those of his papers that might have settled this matter has left any assessment speculative.

According to Christopher Sykes, he did not have sexual relations with his wife, who initially left him after just six weeks. Sykes has reported: "The closest the marriage ever came to consummation was that he would make her pose naked covered top to bottom in jewels and she had to sleep wearing the jewels".

Financial trouble and death
By 1904, despite his inheritance and income, Paget had accumulated debts of £544,000 (£ in ) and on 11 June was declared bankrupt. His lavish wardrobe, particularly his dressing gowns from Charvet, and jewels were sold to pay creditors, the jewels alone realising £80,000.

In 1905, Paget died in Monte Carlo following a long illness, with his ex-wife by his side, and his remains were returned to St Edwen's Church, Llanedwen, on his Anglesey estate, for burial. The Times reported that despite all that was known of him, he remained much liked by the people of Bangor, who were sorry to hear of his death. In 1909, Lilian, Marchioness of Anglesey, married John Francis Grey Gilliat (a banker) by whom she had three children.

The title passed to his cousin Charles Henry Alexander Paget, who destroyed all the papers of the 5th Marquess and converted the Gaiety Theatre back into a chapel. It was at least in part owing to the debts left by the 5th Marquess that the family's principal English estate at Beaudesert, Staffordshire, had to be broken up and sold in the 1930s. The Paget family moved into Plas Newydd as their permanent residence.

Legacy
Plas Newydd remained in the possession of the Paget family until 1976, when it was donated to the National Trust. Today the house and gardens are open to the public, and the house contains an art collection which includes a number of photographs of the 5th Marquess in theatrical costume.

In March 2020, a diamond tiara claimed to have been worn by the 5th Marquess was put up for auction (not by the Paget family) at the 2020 European Fine Art Fair in Maastricht. There is no proof Paget ever owned the tiara, but it was worn by Marjorie, Marchioness of Anglesey (wife of the 6th Marquess) at the coronation of King George VI in 1937.

Paget's style has often been compared to that of the flamboyant rock star Freddie Mercury.

In 2017 the actor and composer Seiriol Davies wrote and performed in How To Win Against History, a musical based on Paget's life. The award-winning show was performed at the 2017 Edinburgh Festival Fringe before a tour of Wales and England. In 2019 the show had its Irish premiere at the Dublin Theatre Festival.

The British-American fashion designer Harris Reed cited Paget as an inspiration for his 2020 collection Thriving In Our Outrage.

Notes

References

Sources

1875 births
1905 deaths
Royal Welch Fusiliers officers
People educated at Eton College
Henry
British theatre managers and producers
Male-to-female cross-dressers
Welsh male dancers
British male dancers
19th-century British dancers
5
19th-century British businesspeople